Ziaul Haque Zia (11 March 1953 – 4 November 2016) was a Bangladesh Nationalist Party politician. He was a 4-term Jatiya Sangsad member representing the Lakshmipur-1 constituency. He served as the Minister of Local Government, Rural Development and Co-operatives between 2001 and 2006.

Early life
Zia was born on 11 March 1953, into a Bengali Muslim family in the village of Keturi in Bhadur Union, Ramganj, Noakhali District, Bengal Presidency (now in Lakshmipur District, Bangladesh).

Career
Zia started working in Rupali Bank. He joined the Bangladesh Nationalist Party in 1986. In 2008, the special court convicted Zia of amassing wealth illegally and concealing information from the Anti-Corruption Commission. In 2009, a High Court bench granted bail to eight convicts including Zia.

Personal life
Zia was married to Nasima Haque, with whom he had one son, Mashfiqul Haque Joy.

Death
Zia died on 4 November 2016 under treatment for cancer at Bumrungrad International Hospital in Bangkok, Thailand.

References

1953 births
20th-century Bengalis
21st-century Bengalis
2016 deaths
Bangladesh Nationalist Party politicians
Deaths from cancer in Thailand
State Ministers of Local Government, Rural Development and Co-operatives
5th Jatiya Sangsad members
6th Jatiya Sangsad members
7th Jatiya Sangsad members
8th Jatiya Sangsad members
People from Ramganj Upazila